The 1995–96 Ranji Trophy was the 62nd season of the Ranji Trophy. Karnataka defeated Tamil Nadu on first innings lead in the finals. For the first time, three teams in the semifinals were from the same zone - Hyderabad being the third team from the South Zone.

Sunil Joshi became the first, and as of 2015 the only, player to do the double of 500 runs and 50 wickets in a season.

Knockout stage

Quarter-finals

Semi-finals

Final

Scorecards and averages
Cricketarchive

References

External links
 Ranji Trophy, 1995-96 at ESPNcricinfo

1996 in Indian cricket
Ranji Trophy seasons
Domestic cricket competitions in 1995–96